Abiy Ahmed became the Prime Minister of Ethiopia on April 2, 2018. He was formerly the chairman of the Ethiopian People's Revolutionary Democratic Front (EPRDF) from 2018 until its dissolution in 2019 when it was replaced by the Prosperity Party. 

Since taking office, Abiy has released several political prisoners jailed by the former ruling party EPRDF and embarked on major reforms in the country with the goal of liberalization. This includes the downsizing of state-owned enterprises and encouraging privatization. In October 2019, Abiy received the Nobel Peace Prize for ending hostile tensions between Ethiopia and Eritrea during the 2019 summit. However, ethnic factions and violence continued, eventually reaching critical status during his tenure, and his government was criticized as increasingly authoritarian in the years after he received the Nobel Peace Prize. Hostility between the Tigray authorities led by the Tigray People's Liberation Front (TPLF) and the federal government increased following the 2020 regional election in Tigray Region, which the government deemed "illegal." In November 2020, the Tigray War started between the Ethiopian and Tigray governments, with respective military and paramilitary allies. The war caused civilian casualties and thousands of displacements.

Prelude
Abiy started his political career as a member of the Oromo Democratic Party (ODP) from 2010 to 2012, ruling the Oromia Region since 1991. He became the chief committee and congress member, then a member of the Executive Committee of the EPRDF. Before ODP, he served as The Housing and Urban Development Bureau Head with the rank of Oromia Regional State Cabin Deputy Head of State. 

From 2007 to 2010, Abiy served in Ethiopia's Information Network Security Agency. During the 2010 general election, he was elected to the House of People's Representatives, representing the Agaro constituency. At this time, while embroiled in the religious conflict between the Christian and Muslim majority led, he launched the "Religious Forum finance," a forum designed to impose resolution and create interaction with the Muslim-Christian community.

After serving for one year, Abiy was reinstated as an executive member of OPDO. In late 2016, he was appointed Deputy President of the Oromia Region while serving in the House of People's Representatives. With this position, Abiy became head of the OPDO Secretariat and Oromia Housing and Urban Development Office and was elected as a member of the executive committee of the Ethiopian People's Revolutionary Democratic Front (EPRDF) in early 2018. The 2016 Oromo protests led to his fellow leader Lemma Megersa's unanimous support of Ethiopians abroad for reforms in OPDO. In mid-February 2018, OPDO invited opposition party members to Ethiopia to survey the democratic system in the Oromia Region and Ethiopia. The invitation led to tantamount praise from these parties.

The ruling coalition EPRDF voted Abiy as a chairman and, in turn, Prime Minister. They elected him after an in-depth review of the executive committee's performance and renewal program on March 20, 2018. Shiferaw Shigute, a head officer of EPRDF, announced in a press conference that the Council's meeting was successful and "entertaining," and "agreements were reached to widening internal democracy within the party, tackling unprincipled networks and antidemocratic attitudes." Shiferaw also introduced the election of Abiy as "transparent" while all members reasonably voted for it. The meeting was held to prevent the distrust and scepticism that the party faced with past leadership.

According to the Secretary, there were no secret negotiations with the appointment respecting the party's rules and norms. Shiferaw also said the withdrawal of Demeke Mekonnen had no direct correlation with the election, and reshuffling would be possible by evaluating the EPRDF cabinet but not necessary.

On April 2, 2018, Abiy was sworn in as Prime Minister of Ethiopia in the House of People's Representatives and promised to "build peaceful diplomatic relations with Eritrea, to work for inclusive development, combatting corruption in the democratic environment." Abiy also pledged to initiate women and youths as the main power of development in the country and end the civil unrest that started in 2016.

Domestic policy
Since taking office, Abiy's government released many political prisoners that former EPRDF rulers jailed; among them were activist Kinfe Michael Debebe, Ginbot 7 leader Andargachew Tsige and his colleague Berhanu Nega, and Oromo dissident and public intellectual Jawar Mohammed. Most remaining detainees were journalists from US-based ESAT and OMN satellite television networks. On May 30, Abiy's surprise meeting with Andargachew was termed by many critics as "unprecedented and previously unimaginable," who was sentenced to the death penalty and would be nearly on death row within 24 hours. Critics termed the condition "bold and remarkable." He was apprehended at Sana'a International Airport, Yemen, in 2014 and extradited to Ethiopia.

On the same day, the government would amend the country's "draconian" anti-terrorism law, widely perceived as a tool for political repression. Abiy would hint at abolishing anti-terrorism law that "led to the detention and persecution of thousands in East African country." On June 1, 2018, Abiy announced the end of the state of emergency imposed two years prior, which was lifted on June 4. In his first briefing to the House of Peoples' Representatives in June 2018, Abiy countered criticism of his government's release of convicted "terrorists," which, according to the opposition, is just a name the EPRDF gives you if you are a part or even meet the "opposition." He argued that policies that sanctioned arbitrary detention and torture constituted extra-constitutional acts of terror aimed at suppressing opposition. Three hundred and four prisoners (289 convicted of terrorism charges) were pardoned on June 15. According to the Ethiopian attorney general through Fana Television, three Kenyan sentenced prisoners were released after the bilateral agreement was signed between Ethiopia and Kenya and potentially would increase relations. By that time, in total, 1,000 prisoners had been removed.

An editorial pro-government website Tigrai Online expressed the maintenance of a state of emergency as vital, and Abiy's step was "doing too much too fast." Other reactionaries were concerned that the release of thousands of political prisoners would impact Ethiopia's criminal justice system if they were dangerous criminals and arsonists. On June 13, the TPLF executive committee denounced that the handover of Badme over the Algiers Agreement and privatization of state-owned enterprises were "fundamentally flawed," and potentially, the ruling coalition would suffer from a fundamental leadership deficit.

On August 1, 2018, Abune Merkorios, the fourth patriarch of the Ethiopian Orthodox Tewahedo Church, returned to Ethiopia after being exiled to the United States in 1991 and was warmly received at Holy Trinity Cathedral Church in Addis Ababa. Abiy said, "the return of the Abune Merkorios is a joyous moment for all Ethiopians. The church has shown in deeds the fall of a wall of division that had split the church."

Transparency

Since 2018, Abiy has expanded the freedom of the press by calling exiled media journalists to return to Ethiopia, especially from ESAT. One of the media outlets invited to return was ESAT (which had previously called for the genocide of Ethiopian Tigrayans). However, as of March 21, 2019, he had given one press conference, and had yet to give another conference without refusing questions from journalists (rather than preparing statements). 

According to Human Rights Watch, Committee to Protect Journalists and Amnesty International, the Abiy government had arrested opposition journalists and closed media outlets, except for ESAT. From the international media outlets, his government had suspended the press license of Reuters's correspondent. It issued a warning letter to the correspondents of both BBC and Deutsche Welle for what the government described as a "violation of the rules of media broadcasting". In the UNESCO World Press Prize official ceremony on May 3, 2019, Abiy told to establish a "truly democratic political order and transform the media landscape" while avoiding misinformation.

Ethiopia's freedom of the press declined in 2021 when 46 journalists were reportedly detained or repressed by the government. The disappearance of journalist Gobez Sisay in 2022 has provoked special controversy surrounding the case.

Economic reforms

In June 2018, Abiy announced the implementation of state-owned enterprises in various economic sectors, such as telecommunications, energy, and transportation. Abiy hoped to end unemployment through privatization and increasing foreign direct investment. State monopolies include Ethiopian Airlines and Ethio Telecom, arguably an interest in privatization, and private sector competition ranges from aviation, electricity, and logistics sectors. 

Ethiopian Airlines, Africa's largest and most profitable, was offered for purchase by both domestic and foreign investors; although maintaining the majority of shares from these firms, the government planned to command the economy. State-owned enterprises in less critical sectors, including railway operators, sugar, industrial parks, hotels and manufacturing firms, may be fully privatized. The move was seen as a pragmatic measure from the past 2017 fiscal year, less than two months' worth of imports, to facilitate the sovereign debt load.

In June 2018, Abiy initiated stock exchange in tandem. Ethiopia registered the fastest economic growth until 2015 without any stock exchanges. In June 2020, the finance minister drafted a bill to create a stock market economy and passed it on December 22, 2020.

Security sector reforms
In June 2018, Abiy spoke to senior Ethiopian National Defense Force (ENDF) senior commanders to reform the military strength and professions, effectively limiting the role in politics. Amnesty International requested that Ethiopia and international human rights groups dissolve the regional paramilitary force, namely the "Liyyu force". A move considered in coronary to the TPLF hardliners, who occupied the military higher command.

Abiy also hoped to move forward the Ethiopian Navy into active duty, and so that landlocked Ethiopia would join the naval force.  He said on state television "we should build our naval force capacity in the future." On June 7, 2018, Abiy reshuffled the armed forces, Chief of Staff Samora Yunis with Lieutenant General Se'are Mekonnen, National Intelligence and Security Service (NISS) director Getachew Assefa with General Adem Mohammed, National Security Advisor and former army chief Abadula Gemeda and Sebhat Nega. As a chief cofounder of the TPLF, Sebhat announced his retirement that May.

Internet shutdowns
Internet shutdowns have increasingly prevailed under Abiy's administration. While supporters defend the action as a useful tool to control information and Blogspot, opponents have criticized it as a punitive technique. According to Human Rights Watch and NetBlocks, politically motivated shutdowns have been increasing severely despite the country's reliance on rapid digitalization and cellular internet connectivity in recent years. In 2020, internet shutdowns were "frequently deployed". Access Now states the shutdowns have become a "go-to tool for authorities to muzzle unrest and activism." His government will cut the internet as and when "it's neither water nor air", said Abiy.

Cabinet reshuffle
On October 16, 2018, Abiy reduced the size of ministers from 28 to 20 in a parliament session. Half the majority were females, marking an unprecedented move in the country's history. For instance, his new cabinet reshuffled Sahle-Work Zewde as the first female president, Aisha Mohammed Musa as the Ministry of Defense, and Muferiat Kamil as Ministry of Peace, oversight of intelligence and security agencies. In addition, Ethiopian writer and activist Billene Seyoum was the first press secretary of the Office of the Prime Minister.

Political party reform
The EPRDF administration consisted of four parties: the majority represented by ethnic groups. Examples, The Tigray People's Liberation Front (TPLF), the Oromo People Democratic Organization (OPDO), the Amhara National Democratic Movement (ANDM), and the Southern Ethiopian People's Democratic Movement (SEPDM). On November 21, 2019, Abiy formed his new Prosperity Party by merging four of EPRDF's parties:

 the Oromo Democratic Party (ODP)
 the Southern Ethiopian People's Democratic Movement (SEPDM)
 the Amhara Democratic Party (ADP)
 the Harari National League (HNL)
 the Ethiopian Somali Peoples Democratic Party (ESPDP)
 the Afar National Democratic Party (ANDP)
 the Gambella Peoples Unity Party (GPUP)
 the Benishangul Gumuz Peoples Democratic Party (BGPDP)

Abiy believes that the "Prosperity Party is committed to strengthening and applying a true federal system which recognizes the diversity and contributions of all Ethiopians".

Foreign policy
During the 2017 Saudi Arabian purges, Abiy released about 1,000 Ethiopian prisoners following a request to Saudi Crown Prince Mohammed bin Salman. He also discussed bilateral, regional, and global issues surrounding the two countries during two days visit. Notable detainee includes billionaire Mohammed Hussein Al-Amoudi. In June 2018, Abiy met Egyptian president Abdel Fattah el-Sisi in Cairo. Similarly, he took another meeting with South Sudanese president Salva Kiir and rebel leader Riek Machar in Addis Ababa to encourage peace talks. Ethiopia also played a vital role in the regional bloc IGAD's wavering for the peace process in South Sudan.

Djibouti and port agreement

In May 2018, Ethiopia announced its intention to take the Port of Djibouti, a gateway for trade, after the two countries had dealt with it. Djibouti had been seeking foreign investors due to the termination of Dubai's state-owned DP World concession and failure to compile a contract for six years. The government announced it would take a 19% stake in Berbera Port, located in the unrecognized Republic of Somaliland, as part of a joint venture with DP World. Two days later, Sudan agreed to grant Port Sudan to Ethiopia. The Ethio-Djibouti agreement allowed Djibouti to opt for stakes in state-owned Ethiopian firms, such as Ethio Telecom and Ethiopian Airlines. This would be met after Abiy and Kenyan president Uhuru Kenyatta had reached to build an Ethiopian logistics facility at Lamu Port, part of the Lamu Port and Lamu-Southern Sudan-Ethiopia Transport Corridor (LAPSSET) project. The potential normal relations with Eritrea would grant Port of Massawa and Asseb, which would benefit specifically northern Ethiopia, Tigray Region.

Eritrea

Since taking office, Abiy vigorously worked to end the Ethiopian–Eritrean conflict. In June 2018, the government announced it would hand over the disputed Badme to Eritrea. In June 2018, the government announced it would formally end the hostility between the two countries and comply with the 2000 Algiers Agreement. Both countries were in frozen conflict described as "no war, no peace" since the war killed tens of thousands of people. The BBC Tigrinya editor Samuel Gebrehiwot stated, "change could be on the cards, but few imagined it could happen this quickly". 

On 20 June 2018, Eritrean president Isaias Afewerki sent a high-level delegation to Addis Ababa to implement a peace agreement by Algiers Agreement. On 26 June, Eritrean Foreign Minister Osman Saleh Mohammed visited Addis Ababa for the first time in over two decades. In Asmara on 8 July 2018, Abiy became the first leader to meet his counterpart Isaias Afewerk in the 2018 Eritrea–Ethiopia summit in over two decades. Abiy successfully ended the bilateral tension by signing the "Joint Declaration of Peace and Friendship", rejoicing in direct telecommunications, road, and aviation links, and using Massawa and Asseb. Abiy was subsequently awarded an unprecedented Nobel Peace Prize in 2019 for these deeds.

Those relations were later deemed unimplemented, while some critics and even the Eritrean diaspora disapproved of the Nobel Peace Prize for such insignificant changes. In July 2020, the Eritrean Ministry of Information criticized the treaty: "Two years after the signing of the Peace Agreement, Ethiopian troops continue to be present in our sovereign territories. Trade and economic ties of both countries have not resumed to the desired extent or scale." On the other hand, anonymous Ethiopian officials alleged that both Abiy and Isaias had a secret plot against Tigray.

Egypt
 
The disputed Grand Ethiopian Renaissance Dam has been a preoccupation of both countries. On 4 July 2018, a panel discussion was held at the headquarter of the council in Ethiopia with respective ambassadors to discuss the facilitation of foreign relations with Egypt and other Arab countries and coordinating with the private sector to serve Egyptian strategic interests. Abiy pledged the dam would not affect Egypt's shares of the Nile water that adhered to the 1959 Convention, a reversal of predecessor government decisions in a "more flexible" manner. In a January 2022 letter, Abiy called on Sudan and Egypt to "nurture towards building peace, cooperation, mutual co-existence and development of all our people without harming one another. If there is a need to go to war, we could get millions readied." By 2019, Egypt feared that the water flow would decrease, while the UN predicted Egypt would lose its water supply by 2025. However, Abiy rejected the concern underlining that "no force can stop the dam's completion".

The murder of activist, singer and political icon Hachalu Hundessa ignited violence across Addis Ababa and other Ethiopian cities; Abiy hinted, without obvious suspects or clear motives for the killing, that Hundessa may have been murdered by Egyptian security agents acting on orders from Cairo to stir up trouble. An Egyptian diplomat responded that Egypt "has nothing to do with current tensions in Ethiopia".  In a Time magazine article, Ian Bremmer wrote that Prime Minister Abiy "may just be looking for a scapegoat that can unite Ethiopians against a perceived common enemy".

Civil conflicts

Ethnic clashes drastically increased during Abiy Ahmed's tenure. The first conflict was Gedeo–West Gurji, which displaced 1.4 million people, the highest violence-related displacement in 2018 caused by a shortage of food, farmland, and livestock supplements. Awol Allo argues that when Abiy came to power in 2018, two irreconcilable and paradoxical future visions were created. Central of these ideological visions often contradicts the historical narrative of the Ethiopian state.Abiy undertook significant reforms in the country, and the liberation was suspected of worsening the relationship with TPLF members.

Amhara Region coup d'état attempt 

On 22 June 2019, factions of the region's security forces attempted a coup d'état against the regional government, during which the President of the Amhara Region, Ambachew Mekonnen, was assassinated.  A bodyguard siding with the nationalist factions assassinated General Se'are Mekonnen – the Chief of the General Staff of the Ethiopian National Defense Force – as well as his aide, Major General Gizae Aberra.  The Prime Minister's Office accused Brigadier General Asaminew Tsige, head of the Amhara region security forces, of leading the plot, and Tsige was shot dead by police near Bahir Dar on 24 June.

Metekel conflict 

Starting in June 2019, fighting in the Metekel Zone of the Benishangul-Gumuz Region in Ethiopia has reportedly involved militias from the Gumuz people. Gumuz allegedly has formed militias such as Buadin and the Gumuz Liberation Front that have staged attacks. According to Amnesty International, the 22–23 December 2020 attacks were by Gumuz against Amhara, Oromo and Shinasha, whom the Gumuz nationalists viewed as "settlers".

October 2019 Ethiopian clashes 

In October 2019, Ethiopian activist and media owner Jawar Mohammed claimed that members of the police had attempted to force his security detail to vacate the grounds of his home in Addis Ababa to detain him the night of 23 October, intimating that they had done so at the behest of Prime Minister Abiy Ahmed. The previous day, Abiy had given a speech in Parliament in which he had accused "media owners who don't have Ethiopian passports" of "playing it both ways", a thinly veiled reference to Jawar, adding that "if this is going to undermine the peace and existence of Ethiopia... we will take measures."

Hachalu Hundessa riots 

The murder of Oromo singer Hachalu Hundessa led to serious unrest across Oromia Region, Addis Ababa and Jimma from 30 June to 2 July 2020. The riots led to the deaths of at least 239 people, according to initial police reports.

Tigray War 

In early November 2020, an armed conflict began after 4 November Northern Command Attacks by TPLF security forces, prompting the ENDF to engage in war. The ENDF is supported by Eritrean Defence Force, Amhara and Afar Region special forces with other regional forces, while Tigray Special Force and Tigray Defense Force aided TPLF.
Hostilities between the central government and the TPLF escalated after the TPLF rejected the central government's decision to postpone the August 2020 elections to mid-2021 due to the COVID-19 pandemic, accusing the government of violating the Ethiopian constitution.

The TPLF conducted its regional elections, winning all contested seats in the region's parliament. In response, Abiy Ahmed redirected funding from the top level of the Tigray regional government to lower ranks to weaken the TPLF party.

The central matter of the civil conflict, as portrayed by Abiy and as reported by Seku Ture, a member of the TPLF party, is an attack on the Northern Command bases and headquarters in the Tigray region by security forces of the TPLF,the province's elected party; though such a claim is contested.

The Ethiopian government announced on 28 November 2020 that they had captured Mekelle, the capital of Tigray, completing their "rule of law operations". However, there are reports that guerrilla-style conflict with the TPLF continues.

According to the United Nations, about 2.3 million children are cut off from desperately needed aid and humanitarian assistance. The Ethiopian federal government has made strict control of access to the Tigray region (since the start of the conflict), and the UN said it is frustrated that talks with the Ethiopian government have yet to bring humanitarian access. These include "food, including ready-to-use therapeutic food for the treatment of child malnutrition, medicines, water, fuel and other essentials that are running low", said UNICEF.

On 18 December 2020, looting was reported by EEPA, including 500 dairy cows and hundreds of calves stolen by Amhara forces. On 23 November, a reporter from the AFP news agency visited the western Tigray town of Humera and observed that officials took over the administration of the conquered parts of Western Tigray from the Amhara Region. Refugees interviewed by Agence France Presse (AFP) stated that the pro-tplf troops used Hitsats as a base for several weeks in November 2020, killing several refugees who wanted to leave the camp to get food and, in one incident, killed nine young Eritrean men in revenge for having lost a battle against the EDF.

In his premature victory speech delivered to the federal parliament on 30 November 2020, Abiy Ahmed pronounced: "Related to civilian damage, maximum caution was taken in just three weeks of fighting, in any district, Humera, Adi Goshu, Axum, Edaga Hamus. The defence forces never killed a single civilian in a single town. No soldier from any country could display better competence."

On 21 March 2021, during a parliamentary session in which Abiy Ahmed was questioned on sexual violence in the Tigray War, he replied: "The women in Tigray? These women have only been penetrated by men, whereas a knife penetrated our soldiers". There is a fear that the people of Tigray – particularly the women – cannot live with what has been said, what has been admitted, and above all, with a Prime Minister who has endorsed a culture of rape."

The public image of a Nobel Peace Prize winner is rapidly re-assessed by international media as increasingly grisly reports of atrocities emerge. The US Secretary of State, Antony Blinken, has been quoted as saying that he had seen "very credible reports of human rights abuses and atrocities" and that "forces from Eritrea and Amhara must leave and be replaced by a force that will not abuse the human rights of the people of Tigray or commit acts of ethnic cleansing'." In December 2021, Declan Walsh reported in The New York Times that Abiy and Isaias had been secretly planning the Tigray War even before the former's Nobel Prize was awarded to settle their respective grudges against the TPLF.

References

Premierships
2018 in Ethiopia